John Richard Latchford (16 June 1909 – 30 April 1980) was an English cricketer.  Latchford was a right-handed batsman who bowled right-arm medium pace.  He was born in Delph, Saddleworth, Yorkshire.

Having played for the Lancashire Seconds in the Minor Counties Championship since 1927, Latchford eventually made his first-class debut for the county against the Minor Counties in 1930.  He made 6 further first-class appearances, the last of which came against Middlesex in the 1932 County Championship.  In his 7 first-class matches for Lancashire, he scored 154 runs at an average of 15.40, with a high score of 63.  This score, his only first-class fifty, came against Gloucestershire in the 1931 County Championship.  With the ball, he took 4 wickets at a bowling average of 45.25, with best figures of 1/6.  He left Lancashire at the end of the 1933 season.

He later joined Durham, making his debut for the county against the Yorkshire Second XI in the 1935 Minor Counties Championship.  He played Minor counties cricket for Durham from 1935 to 1939, making 22 appearances.  Latchford died in Omagh, County Tyrone, Northern Ireland on 30 April 1980.

References

External links
Jack Latchford at ESPNcricinfo
Jack Latchford at CricketArchive

1909 births
1980 deaths
People from Saddleworth
English cricketers
Lancashire cricketers
Durham cricketers
Sportspeople from Yorkshire